SS Fred Herrling was a Liberty ship built in the United States during World War II. She was named after Fred Herrling, a Merchant seaman killed on the cargo ship , 28 November 1942, when she was

Construction
Fred Herrling was laid down on 23 December 1944, under a Maritime Commission (MARCOM) contract, MC hull 2517, by the St. Johns River Shipbuilding Company, Jacksonville, Florida; she was sponsored by Mrs. Kenneth Jones, the niece of the namesake, and she was launched on 30 January 1945.

History
She was allocated to the R.A. Nichol & Company, on 10 February 1945. On 17 August 1948, she was laid up in the National Defense Reserve Fleet, Wilmington, North Carolina. She was sold for scrapping, 4 April 1968, to Union Minerals & Alloys Corp. She was removed from the fleet, 14 May 1968.

References

Bibliography

 
 
 
 
 

 

Liberty ships
Ships built in Jacksonville, Florida
1945 ships
Wilmington Reserve Fleet